Grogol Station (GGL) is a railway station in Jelambar, Grogol Petamburan, West Jakarta. It is the second station on the Duri-Tangerang branch line Brown Line service. The station is a strategic point for students as it is located within close proximity of Trisakti University and the University of Tarumanegara.

Before the reactivation, the station which used to serve the Tangerang DMU (KRD) train line only was inactive along with the construction of the Duri–Tangerang double-track.

Building and layout 
This station has two railway tracks, where both of them are straight tracks.

Services

Passenger services 
 KAI Commuter

Supporting transportation

Gallery

References

West Jakarta
Railway stations in Jakarta